Eva Horáková, née Němcová (born 3 December 1972), is a Czech basketball player.

Life and career
The youngest of three children of Jiřina Němcová and Zdeněk Němec, she began her basketball career at the age of 18. She played for the Czech Republic national team in 1992 Summer Olympics, which finished at sixth place. In 1997, she entered the Women's National Basketball Association (WNBA) and went on to spend five seasons playing for the now-defunct Cleveland Rockers. She was named a member of the All-WNBA first team and second team in 1997 and 1998 respectively. During the 2000 WNBA season, she set a league record by making 66 consecutive free throws. She was the ninth WNBA player to score 1,000 career points.

In 2005, Němcová won a gold medal with the Czech national team at the Eurowomen tournament.

Career statistics

Regular season

|-
| style="text-align:left;"|1997
| style="text-align:left;"|Cleveland
| 28 || 28 || 33.7 || .473 || style="background:#D3D3D3" |.435° || .855 || 3.9 || 2.4 || 1.4 || 0.3 || 2.8 || 13.7
|-
| style="text-align:left;"|1998
| style="text-align:left;"|Cleveland
| 30 || 30 || 32.4 || .468 || style="background:#D3D3D3" |.452° || .893 || 3.7 || 2.2 || 1.1 || 0.7 || 2.1 || 12.0
|-
| style="text-align:left;"|1999
| style="text-align:left;"|Cleveland
| 31 || 28 || 29.8 || .419 || .366 || style="background:#D3D3D3" |.984° || 3.7 || 1.6 || 1.0 || 0.7 || 2.6 || 11.1
|-
| style="text-align:left;"|2000
| style="text-align:left;"|Cleveland
| 14 || 14 || 31.6 || .409 || .408 || .917 || 2.9 || 1.6 || 1.1 || 0.6 || 1.9 || 13.2
|-
| style="text-align:left;"|2001
| style="text-align:left;"|Cleveland
| 8 || 2 || 14.1 || .342 || .200 || .625 || 1.3 || 1.0 || 0.3 || 0.6 || 0.8 || 4.3
|-
| style="text-align:left;"|Career
| style="text-align:left;"|5 years, 1 team
| 111 || 102 || 30.6 || .442 || .402 || .897 || 3.5 || 1.9 || 1.1 || 0.6 || 2.3 || 11.8

Playoffs

|-
| style="text-align:left;"|1998
| style="text-align:left;"|Cleveland
| 3 || 3 || 30.7 || .321 || .200 || 1.000 || 3.0 || 4.7 || 0.7 || 0.7 || 2.7 || 7.0

References

1972 births
Living people
Basketball players at the 1992 Summer Olympics
Cleveland Rockers players
Czech expatriate basketball people in the United States
Czechoslovak women's basketball players
Czech women's basketball players
Olympic basketball players of Czechoslovakia
Sportspeople from Prague
Forwards (basketball)